Toledo Executive Airport  is seven miles southeast of Toledo, in Wood County, Ohio. It is an FAA designated reliever to Toledo Express Airport (TOL), Toledo's primary airport. Toledo Executive Airport was renamed from Metcalf Field in 2010.

History 

The airport began as a grand dream on June 22, 1927 with the establishment of The Toledo Airport Committee.  A site was chosen and funds were quickly raised, and on June 3, 1928 "The Transcontinental Airport of Toledo, Incorporated." was dedicated to a large crowd. The dream was soon realized, as the airport set records for air mail and became the second largest airport east of the Rocky Mountains. National Air Transport had begun service with passenger and air mail flights to Chicago and Cleveland. By 1931 National and three other airlines had merged becoming United Airlines and Toledo had become a stop on a transcontinental air route extending from San Francisco to New York. 

The boom period did not last. Inadequate construction began to crumble, driving away business.  The Great Depression hit.  Ultimately, however, neighboring developments prevented the airport from expanding its runways to meet the needs of increasingly larger commercial aircraft.  When the larger Toledo Express Airport was built in 1954, the field became redundant.

The field languished for over a decade, used for things such as fireworks displays and drag racing. General Aviation and business jets in the late 1960s and early 1970s brought the field back into use as an airport;  private, business and charter flights continue to be the main activities.

Timeline 
 June 22, 1927 – The Toledo Airport Committee was established, selecting a name of "The Transcontinental Airport of Toledo, Incorporated."
 January 25, 1928 – $257,000 was raised in 33 1/2 hours, which is the time it took Charles Lindbergh to fly from New York City to Paris.  Six hundred and twenty shares of stock were sold to 620 Toledo citizens.
 March 1928 – 515 acres purchased from local farmers. The site was chosen partly because it was near the route from Chicago to New York.
 June 3, 1928 – The airport was dedicated to a crowd of 30,000 to 50,000.
 14-year-old Nan Beth Jackson, daughter of Mayor William T. Jackson, christened a National Air Transport plane "Miss Toledo".
 Leo McGinn piloted the first mail plane, a Curtiss biplane carrying a passenger, sixty pounds of mail, and fifty pounds of express from Cleveland on this day.
 Airmail postage was ten cents to send a letter to any destination, nationwide.
 1928 – A complete weather station was installed.  The U.S. Weather Bureau of Toledo operated here until January 12, 1955.
 January 16, 1929 – A national record-setting quantity of mail was carried from the airport.
 1929 – A 500,000,000 candlepower field floodlight was installed that "literally lit up the field like daylight" to support night operations.
 November 11, 1936 – Franklin D. Roosevelt approved allocating $216,077 in Works Progress Administration funds for upgrades. The city of Toledo provided $52,000 in matching funds.  These funds provided three paved runways.
 November 25, 1936 – The City of Toledo purchased the airport and renamed it "The Toledo Municipal Airport".
 1937 – The airport became a Class One port and the second largest airfield east of the Rocky Mountains.
 August 23, 1938 – The two-year-old runways proved to be unfit and started to buckle, causing United Airlines to suspend service, leaving the airport largely unused.
 1940 – Two concrete runways were built with federal money for $275,000.
 June 29, 1941 – The airport reopened.
 1948 – A terminal building with a control tower was built for $175,000 with funds from the federal government and the City of Toledo.
 1954 – Airlines moved to the new Toledo Express Airport.
 Fall 1954 – Toledo city council voted to abandon the field.
 Unknown Dates – The site was used for fireworks displays after being abandoned.
 February 1955 – The H. H. Buggie Company bought 47.1 acres of land and buildings in the Southwest corner of the airport, leaving the field with no buildings or hangars. The hangars were torn down, with the exception of the Curtiss hangar.
 1960s – The field was used for automotive drag racing between aircraft landings.  It was first known as "Vettesville", then "Greater Toledo Dragway".
 November 28, 1966 – Executive Aviation signed a fifteen-year lease and invested $250,000 in a new main hangar, 20 T-hangars, and a fuel facility.
 October 22, 1967 – The airport reopened.
 March 1970 – Astro Aviation took over operations at the airport.
 December 23, 1974 – Crow Executive Air, Inc. was established at the field.
 February 12, 1975 – The airport was put under the control of the Toledo–Lucas County Port Authority.
 August 28, 1977 – Renamed "Metcalf Field" after Tommy Metcalf, Toledo's second commissioner of aviation.
 April 18, 2007 – A FedEx Boeing 727 landed at the airport to be decommissioned and provided to Owens Community College for ground-based training.
 May 11, 2010 – Name changed to "Toledo Executive Airport"
 June 5, 2010 – An EF4 tornado passed along the south edge of the airport.  Neighboring Lake High School and other structures were severely affected.

Early Nearby Airports 
 215-acre airfield on Stickney Avenue, just north of Toledo.
 Franklin Airport – 5035 Monroe Street in Toledo.  It was closed on September 15, 1952.
 National Airport – 165-acre airfield located at Telegraph and Alexis road in Toledo.  It was sold in the early 1960s.

Notable Visitors 
 Prince of Wales – Unknown date
 Arthur Godfrey – Unknown date
 Charles A. Lindbergh – About 1929
 Wiley Post and Harold Gatty – July 28, 1931
 Amelia Earhart – September 7, 1931
 Jimmy Doolittle – About 1933
 Douglas Corrigan – August 19, 1938
 Dwight D. Eisenhower – October 15, 1953

Facilities
Toledo Executive Airport covers 450 acres (180 ha) and has two asphalt runways: 4/22 is 3,799 x 75 ft (1,158.2 x 22.9 m) and 14/32 is 5,829 x 100 ft (1,777 x 30.5 m).
Air America Aviation Services, provides fixed-base operations.

Blue Horizons Flying Club operates from the field; 

EAA Chapter 582 is on the field.

Air America Aerial Ads, LLC is stationed and operates from the field;

Operations
In the year ending May 18, 2009 the airport had 90,600 aircraft operations, average 248 per day: 64% general aviation, 22% air taxi, 14% transient general aviation, and <1% military.

Aircraft
As of May 2009, 51 aircraft are based at the airport: 34 single-engine, 16 multi-engine, 1 jet and 0 helicopters.

Accidents and incidents
On 1 July 2011, at 7:30 p.m. after takeoff from TDZ, an ultralight Couvillion S-17, N433GC, lost power. Upon returning to the ground, it collided with a fence at a construction site. It also struck a pile of gravel before coming to rest in a barn. There were no injuries reported.

References

External links
 Toledo–Lucas County Port Authority: Aviation Services
 

Airports in Ohio
Transportation in Toledo, Ohio
Works Progress Administration in Toledo, Ohio